The Rural Municipality of Wolverine No. 340 is a rural municipality (RM) in the Canadian province of Saskatchewan within Census Division No. 11 and  Division No. 5. It is located in the central portion of the province east of Saskatoon.

History 
The RM of Plasterfield No. 340 was originally incorporated as a rural municipality on December 13, 1909. Its name was changed to the RM of Wolverine No. 340 on March 31, 1910. The RM's name is derived from Wolverine Lake, which lies near the centre of the RM.

Geography

Communities and localities 
The following unincorporated communities are within the RM.

Localities
 Attica
 Bay Tail
 Burr
 Wolverine

Demographics 

Government 
The RM of Wolverine No. 340 is governed by an elected municipal council and an appointed administrator. The reeve of the RM is Bryan Gibney while its administrator is Sandi Dunne. The RM's office is located in Burr.

Transportation 
Rail
Minnedosa - Saskatoon - Edmonton C.P.R—serves Kandahar, Dafoe, Jansen, Esk, Lanigan, Guernsey, Wolverine, Plunkett, Viscount

Roads
Highway 20—North south section from Burr to Lanigan
Highway 667—serves Jansen, Saskatchewan and St. Gregor, Saskatchewan North South through RM

See also 
List of rural municipalities in Saskatchewan

References 

Wolverine
Division No. 11, Saskatchewan